The 1944 Major League Baseball season was contested from April 18 to October 9, 1944. The St. Louis Cardinals and St. Louis Browns were the regular season champions of the National League and American League, respectively. In an all-St. Louis postseason, the Cardinals then defeated the Browns in the World Series, four games to two.

Awards and honors
Baseball Hall of Fame
Kenesaw Mountain Landis
Most Valuable Player
Hal Newhouser (AL) – Pitcher, Detroit Tigers
Marty Marion (NL) – Shortstop, St. Louis Cardinals
The Sporting News Player of the Year Award
Marty Marion (NL) – St. Louis Cardinals
The Sporting News Most Valuable Player Award
Bobby Doerr (AL) – Second base, Boston Red Sox
Marty Marion (NL) – Shortstop, St. Louis Cardinals
The Sporting News Pitcher of the Year Award
Hal Newhouser (AL) – Detroit Tigers
Bill Voiselle (NL) – New York Giants
The Sporting News Manager of the Year Award
Luke Sewell (AL) – St. Louis Browns

Standings

American League

National League

Postseason

Bracket

Managers

American League

National League

Home field attendance

See also
1944 All-American Girls Professional Baseball League season

References

External links
1944 Major League Baseball season schedule at Baseball Reference

 
Major League Baseball seasons